Controller (Basil Sandhurst) is a supervillain appearing in American comic books published by Marvel Comics. The character is usually depicted as an enemy of Iron Man.

Publication history

Controller first appeared in Iron Man #12 and was created by Archie Goodwin and George Tuska.

Fictional character biography
Basil Sandhurst was born in Kittery Point, Maine. Sandhurst worked as an electro-mechanical/chemical research scientist. His obsession with control brought his downfall as a scientist when his refusal to obey ethical restraints got him banned from most research facilities. Sandhurst was prone to fits of rage and in an attempt to calm him, his brother Vincent inadvertently triggered a lab explosion, crippling Basil. Vincent, guilt-ridden, outfitted Basil with an automated lab in which Basil bonded a super-strong exoskeleton to his body, powered by the cerebral energies from those around him using his slave discs. As the Controller, he planned to invade and enslave New York City, but Iron Man and S.H.I.E.L.D. agent Jasper Sitwell foiled his scheme and left the Controller comatose. The Controller eventually came out of his coma and took over the Pinewood Sanitarium. He created an improved set of equipment but was again defeated by Iron Man.

Months later, he was released from prison by the alien Thanos, who upgraded his technology. Thanos promised the Controller rulership of Earth, and so he began enslaving dozens of operatives. He invaded Avengers Mansion and defeated the Avengers and Captain Mar-Vell, and abducted Lou-Ann Savannah. The Controller's egotistical displays endangered Thanos's security, and when the Controller failed to defeat Thanos's enemy, Captain Marvel, the alien left him for dead. The Controller went underground for years, upgrading via Stark technology stolen from Justin Hammer, and eventually enslaved a cult. He set the Blood Brothers against Iron Man and Daredevil. Iron Man defeated him and imprisoned him in a vat of experimental plastic, but he escaped. Alongside one of the Blood Brothers, he fought Iron Man, but Iron Man defeated him once more and he was confined to the prison for supervillains called the Vault. He eventually broke out of jail, only to be defeated by Iron Man again. During the "Acts of Vengeance," the Controller escaped from the Vault and at the behest of the Red Skull, he enslaved Namor the Sub-Mariner and set him against Captain America. He unsuccessfully attempted to control Loki at the behest of the Red Skull, and unsuccessfully attempted to aid the Red Skull against Magneto. He was ultimately defeated by Captain America.

Revived by the world-conquering Master of the World, the Controller became the Master's pawn against the Avengers and Heroes for Hire. Abandoned after a later defeat, the Controller, in an ironic nod to his many hospitalizations, acquired his own clinic, where he influenced the wealthy to do his bidding. However, the Controller could not resist enslaving Tony Stark as well, leading to his latest defeat by Iron Man.

Returned to The Raft, the Controller escaped with dozens of others but was recaptured during a clash with the U-Foes and Avengers.

During the "Secret Invasion" storyline, the Hood hired him as part of his criminal organization to take advantage of the split in the superhero community caused by the Super-Human Registration Act. He appears as part of the Hood's alliance with super-powered heroes; the grouping is intent on defeating the Skrull invasion force of New York City.

Maria Hill found the Controller holed up in the basement of a Futurepharm facility in Austin, Texas, while on orders from Tony Stark. He had been abducting members of the local populace for months to bolster a new army and attempted to brainwash Hill as well. However, she resisted his efforts and freed his drones, sabotaging the entire operation.

The Controller gave White Fang a new suit so that she could kill the Hood.

The Controller later appears in Boston, assembling major crime families together in an Italian restaurant. When the Avengers invade the restaurant, the Controller uses his control discs on the criminals as well as Captain America and the Wasp, but he is defeated by Thor. After the Avengers defeat the first wave of Leviathon monsters, the Controller tries to put a control disc on Thor, but he is stopped by Hercules.

At the time when Tony Stark rebranded his company as Stark Unlimited, Controller infiltrated it while enslaving Bethany Cabe.<ref>Tony Stark: Iron Man #1. Marvel Comics.</ref> He set his sights on the virtual reality program called the eScape. Controller proceeded to tamper with the eScape so he could enthrall the minds of those who use it, resulting in large numbers of the worst eScape users being banned, then let back into the eScape and armed with real weapons that they unknowingly used to wreak havoc all over the world, and whom he siphoned energy from. Tony and his allies were able to trace Controller's location and head there to confront him. By the time they arrived, Iron Man found that Controller had consumed enough energy to grow in size. Because of Controller's hacking, it damaged the Motherboard A.I. who served as the operating system. Motherboard proceeded to abduct Iron Man leaving the others underpowered against a giant-sized Controller. After Andy Bhang was able to encode a signal to shut off the tampered interfaces, upon returning to the real world, Tony hijacked Baintronics' factory to make a 3D print of the Godbuster armor which he used to defeat Controller.

Controller later accompanied Korvac, Blizzard, and Unicorn in fighting Iron Man and Hellcat.

Powers, abilities, and equipment
Basil Sandhurst had designed this armored exoskeleton, which is micro-surgically attached to his body from head and toe that granted him mobility, as well as augmented strength, stamina, and durability. By utilizing the microcircuitry in this helmet, he can drain cerebral energies from people to power up his exoskeleton, magnify its strength, and duplicate their abilities. He has limited psychic capabilities, such as the ability to control a person's actions via "slave disc" or project bolts of mental force from his helmet. The Controller could telepathically manipulate "weak-willed" subjects even without the discs. His exoskeleton have included image inducers, stun mists, and other technologies as needed.

The Controller originally utilized a mind wave Absorbatron to convert the mental energy for use by his exoskeleton, although this device was rendered obsolete after Thanos improved Sandhurst's equipment. The discs now increase his physical attributes in geometric progression to a number of victims wearing slave discs and control their actions all at once.

With his college degree, Sandhurst is also an expert chemist and mechanical engineer.

Other versions
In the Earth X reality, Sandhurst was mentioned as one of the many who were killed when Norman Osborn rose to power.

In other media
Television
 The Controller appears in the Iron Man (1994) episode "The Armor Wars, Part 1", voiced by Jamie Horton. Using Iron Man's technology, he creates slave discs to mentally control his armor, which he uses on executives who visited the Center for Achievement and Bliss Spa. Once he learns of this, Iron Man defeats the Controller and uses a negator pack to destroy his armor.
 The Controller appears in Iron Man: Armored Adventures, voiced by Michael Kopsa. This version is a skilled A.I.M. scientist. In the episode "Ready, A.I.M., Fire", he helps the organization create MODOK while working with Tony Stark to create his slave discs and a control helmet. Despite being defeated by Iron Man, the Controller reminds A.I.M.'s Scientist Supreme of his expertise and usefulness in completing MODOK to keep his leader from terminating him. In "Designed Only For Chaos", the Controller activates MODOK, who knocks him unconscious after foreseeing he will betray A.I.M. in pursuit of improving his slave discs. In "Uncontrollable", the Controller pursues the Hulk and Rick Jones in the hopes of using them to take revenge against A.I.M., only to gain control of Iron Man in his Dynamo Buster Armor. Via Iron Man, he attacks A.I.M. and defeats MODOK, though with the Hulk's help, Iron Man's allies are able to free him from the Controller's control. In "Control+Alt+Delete", A.I.M. frees the Controller from the Vault so he can help them trap Iron Man in a virtual reality world called the Mainframe. Using this, he discovers Iron Man's secret identity and use of the Extremis serum and attempts to recreate it for A.I.M. However, Iron Man is able to use his Extremis abilities to hack the Mainframe and shut it down. Waking up in an A.I.M. facility, the Controller takes control of War Machine to fight Iron Man, but the former is able to fight the disc and overload the Controller's helmet. Following the fight, Iron Man and War Machine hand over an amnesiac Controller to S.H.I.E.L.D.

Video games
 Two Controllers, both named Control, appear in Captain America and the Avengers.
 The Controller appears in the Wii version of Iron Man'' (2008), voiced by Jim Ward. This version is an agent of A.I.M.

References

External links
 Controller at Marvel.com

Characters created by Archie Goodwin (comics)
Characters created by George Tuska
Comics characters introduced in 1969
Fictional characters from Maine
Fictional characters with absorption or parasitic abilities
Fictional characters with superhuman durability or invulnerability
Fictional chemists
Fictional engineers
Fictional slave owners
Marvel Comics characters with superhuman strength
Marvel Comics male supervillains
Marvel Comics mutates
Marvel Comics scientists
Marvel Comics supervillains
Marvel Comics telepaths